Dean Raper (born 20 April 1976) is an Australian former rugby league footballer who played in the 1990s.

Playing career
Raper made his first grade debut for St. George in round 8 1996 against Manly-Warringah at Kogarah Oval.  Raper scored a try for St. George in their 1996 preliminary final victory over North Sydney.

He played fullback for St. George in the 1996 Grand Final loss to Manly-Warringah at the Sydney Football Stadium. 

He retired after the joint venture of St. George and the Illawarra Steelers in 1999.

References

1976 births
St. George Dragons players
Australian rugby league players
Living people
Rugby league fullbacks